Svens is a Swedish surname.

See also
Sven

Swedish-language surnames